"All My Life" is a song recorded by Canadian country music artist Jim Witter. It was released in 1999 as the first single from his second studio album, All My Life. It peaked at number 8 on the RPM Country Tracks chart in April 1999.

Chart performance

Year-end charts

References

1999 songs
1999 singles
Jim Witter songs
Curb Records singles
Songs written by Steve Wariner
Songs written by Jim Witter